Son of Altered Beast is an EP by alternative rock musician Matthew Sweet.  Released following Altered Beast in 1994 by Zoo Entertainment, it contains live and alternate versions of various Sweet songs.

In 2018, independent vinyl reissue label Intervention Records announced a first time on vinyl reissue of Son of Altered Beast. This release was later cancelled in 2019.   On April 10th 2021, Intervention Records announced that it will be releasing both Hybrid SACD and vinyl remasters. Both will be cut from the original master tape and artist approved

Track listing
All songs written by Matthew Sweet, except where noted.
 "Devil with the Green Eyes" [Remix] - 4:41
 "Superdeformed" [Live] - 3:39
 "Someone to Pull the Trigger" [Live] - 4:20
 "Knowing People" [Live] - 4:36
 "I Wanted to Tell You" [Live] - 4:33
 "Don't Cry No Tears" [Live] (Neil Young) - 2:51
 "Ultrasuede" [Studio Outtake] - 3:56

References

1994 debut EPs
Matthew Sweet albums
1994 live albums
Zoo Entertainment (record label) live albums
Live EPs
Zoo Entertainment (record label) EPs
Albums produced by Matthew Sweet